His Royal Highness Togbega Gabusu VI was the Fiaga (Paramount Chief) of the Gbi Traditional Area. The Gbi Traditional Area is popularly known as the Hohoe Area  with Hohoe, being its capital town, doubling as the municipal capital as well. The area is also referred to sometimes as Gbi Dzigbe.

Biography 
He was known in private life as Billy Bright Eli Komla Kumadie and was born on the 20th of June, 1950, to Gustav Koku Kumadie of Gbi-Hohoe and Dorothea Kpegah of Gbi-Bla.

To1985gbega Gabusu VI comes from the Royal Kadrake Gate of the Torkoni clan of Gbi-Hohoe.

Togbega Gabusu VI was the president of the Volta Regional house of Chiefs from the year 2000 to 2008; as the president of the Volta Regional House of Chiefs he was an automatic member of the National House of Chiefs for the same period.

A teacher by profession, he ascended the Gabusu throne on 25 May 1989, and by tradition, Gabusu, is the Chief of Torkoni Clan and the divisional Chief of Gbi-Hohoe as well.

His death was announced by the Gbi Traditional council on the 18th of January 2020.

References 

1950 births
2020 deaths